The 1992 Salem Open was a men's tennis tournament played on outdoor hard courts on Hong Kong Island in Hong Kong that was part of the World Series of the 1992 ATP Tour. It was the 17th edition of the tournament and was held from 13 April through 19 April 1992. First-seeded Jim Courier won the singles title.

Finals

Singles
 Jim Courier defeated  Michael Chang 7–5, 6–3
 It was Courier's 3rd singles title of the year and the 7th of his career.

Doubles
 Brad Gilbert /  Jim Grabb defeated  Byron Black /  Byron Talbot 6–2, 6–1
 It was Gilbert's only doubles title of the year and the 3rd and last of his career. It was Grabb's 3rd doubles title of the year and the 10th of his career.

References

External links
 ITF tournament edition details

Salem Open
Hong Kong Open (tennis)
1992 in Hong Kong sport